The 1980 Kilkenny Senior Hurling Championship was the 86th staging of the Kilkenny Senior Hurling Championship since its establishment by the Kilkenny County Board in 1887.

Ballyhale Shamrocks were the defending champions.

On 2 November 1980, Ballyhale Shamrocks won the championship after a 3-13 to 1-10 defeat of Muckalee/Ballyfoyle Rovers in the final replay. It was their third championship title overall and their third title in succession.

Results

Group 1

Table

Group 2

Table

Play-offs

Quarter-finals

Semi-finals

Final

References

Kilkenny Senior Hurling Championship
Kilkenny Senior Hurling Championship